Love in Quarantine is a 1910 short silent comedy film directed by Frank Powell and starring Mack Sennett.

Plot
The characters Harold and Edith become engaged. However, a feud starts and Edith leaves Harold at the gate to return to their home. Harold follows her back and they both discover a doctor attending to their maid. The ailment forces the doctor to quarantine the home, preventing both Edith and Harold from leaving. They must now sort out their feud in the confines of their place until they both get vaccinated. Edith's mother tries to help things out by having Harold fake sickness, in hopes to draw compassion from Edith. It works briefly, until Edith finds out he's faking it. Even so, the quarrel is resolved and all things return to a happy ending.

Cast
 Stephanie Longfellow as Edith
 Mack Sennett as Harold
 Grace Henderson as Edith's Mother
 Verner Clarges as The Doctor
 Victoria Forde as One of Two Girls
 Jeanie Macpherson
 Owen Moore
 Vivian Prescott
 Lucille Lee Stewart as The Maid (unconfirmed)
 Blanche Sweet
 Dorothy West

See also
 List of American films of 1910
 Blanche Sweet filmography

References

External links

1910 films
1910 short films
American silent short films
Biograph Company films
American black-and-white films
1910 comedy films
Films directed by Frank Powell
Silent American comedy films
American comedy short films
1910s American films